Hakan Ünsal (born 14 May 1973) is a Turkish former professional footballer who played as a left wingback. He achieved third place at the 2002 FIFA World Cup with Turkey national team.

Career
Hakan Ünsal is remembered by many for his rocket left foot and his pinpoint passing as well as his ambition. He played most of his career at Galatasaray after joining from Karabükspor in 1993–94. After being a part of the squad that won the UEFA Cup in 2000, Ünsal moved to Blackburn Rovers of the English Premiership in January 2002. Blackburn had hoped to sign him in time for their upcoming appearance in the 2002 League Cup Final, however a work permit delayed his debut and he missed them lifting the cup. His return to Galatasaray was rapid as he was once again in Galatasaray colours for the 2002–03 season. After leaving Galatasaray following the 2004–05 season, he had a brief stint with Çaykur Rizespor before retiring from football.

He played for Turkey national team and was a participant at the 2002 FIFA World Cup where he collected his third place medal.

He is most famous for an incident during the World Cup when Brazil played Turkey. Rivaldo was about to take a corner and Ünsal kicked the ball at him as he was annoyed about the time Rivaldo was taking, delaying the game, as Brazil was winning 2–1. The ball hit Rivaldo on his legs but he collapsed dramatically holding his face and consequently Ünsal was sent off and Brazil went on to win the match. Rivaldo was fined, but the sanctions were criticized by many as being too lenient.

Ünsal is also remembered for his high level of sportsmanship on the field.

Career statistics

Honours
Galatasaray
 Süper Lig: 1996–97, 1997–98, 1998–99, 1999–2000, 2001–02
 Turkish Cup: 1995–96, 1998–99, 1999–2000, 2004–05
 UEFA Cup: 1999–2000
 UEFA Super Cup: 2000

Turkey
FIFA World Cup third place: 2002

References

External links
 
 
 Profile at TFF.org

Living people
1973 births
People from Sinop, Turkey
Association football defenders
Turkish footballers
Kardemir Karabükspor footballers
Galatasaray S.K. footballers
Çaykur Rizespor footballers
Blackburn Rovers F.C. players
Premier League players
Süper Lig players
UEFA Cup winning players
Turkey international footballers
UEFA Euro 2000 players
2002 FIFA World Cup players
Expatriate footballers in England
Turkish expatriate sportspeople in England
Turkish expatriate footballers